The pied goshawk (Accipiter albogularis) is a species of bird of prey in the family Accipitridae. It is found on Bougainville Island and the Solomon Islands. Its natural habitats are subtropical or tropical moist lowland forest and subtropical or tropical moist montane forest.

References

pied goshawk
Birds of the Solomon Islands
pied goshawk
pied goshawk
Taxonomy articles created by Polbot